Hugh Masekela & The Union of South Africa is the thirteen studio album by South African jazz trumpeter Hugh Masekela released via Chisa Records label in May 1971. The album was re-released on CD in 1994 on MoJazz label.

Track listing

Personnel
Design, photography – Barry Feinstein, Tom Wilkes
Engineer – Lewis Peters
Engineer – Rik Pekkonen
Producer – Stewart Levine
Vocals, alto saxophone – Caiphus Semenya
Vocals, trombone – Jonas Gwangwa
Vocals, trumpet – Hugh Masekela

References

External links

1969 albums
Uni Records albums
Hugh Masekela albums
Albums produced by Stewart Levine